Chilocorus bipustulatus, the heather ladybird, is a beetle species belonging to the family Coccinellidae, subfamily Chilocorinae.

These beetles are found in most of the Palearctic realm, (Europe, North Africa, Asia north of the Himalayan foothills, and northern and central Arabian Peninsula),
 and has been introduced to tropical Africa, Hawaii, and North America.

The elytra of this small beetle are a shiny brown with two reddish-orange spots on each elytron (hence the Latin word , meaning two-blistered). Sometime three spots run in an horizontal line and join into two larger stains.

Wintering occurs as an adult.

In Europe it occurs in fruit gardens, pine forests, and stone quarries. In Poland it was found on grasses, low vegetation and bushes, on heath lands, under flakes of bark on pines and fruit trees, occasionally in leaf litter and in moss

Heather ladybirds feed on aphids and scale insects (mainly belonging to the family Coccidae and Diaspididae) and is often introduced as a biological control in cases of infestation. In France it is considered to be
useful in Citrus orchards.

References

External links
 Invertebrate Ireland On Line
 Bugguide
 Larva of C. bipustulatus

Coccinellidae
Beetles of Europe
Beetles described in 1758
Taxa named by Carl Linnaeus